Oligoryzomys griseolus, also known as the grizzled colilargo or the grayish pygmy rice rat, is a species of rodent in the genus Oligoryzomys of family Cricetidae. It is found in the Andes of Venezuela and nearby Colombia. Its karyotype has 2n = 62 and FNa = 74–76.

References

Literature cited
Gómez-Laverde, M. and Weksler, M. 2008. . In IUCN. IUCN Red List of Threatened Species. Version 2009.2. <www.iucnredlist.org>. Downloaded on November 27, 2009.

Mammals of Colombia
Mammals of Venezuela
Mammals of the Andes
Oligoryzomys
Mammals described in 1912
Taxa named by Wilfred Hudson Osgood
Taxonomy articles created by Polbot